Htaingmathein is the name of a traditional Burmese buttonless hip-length jacket, sometimes with flared bottoms and embroidered sequins. Htaingmathein in Burmese literally means "does not gather while sitting," referring to the fact that the tight-fitting jacket does not crumple up when sitting. This jacket was popular among the aristocratic classes during the Konbaung dynasty, and is now most commonly worn by females as part of a wedding dress, or as traditional dance costume. The htaingmathein is worn over a bodice called yinkhan. Historically, the htaingmathein also had a pair of pendulous appendages on both sides called kalano.

Gallery

See also

Burmese clothing
Kebaya

Burmese clothing
Jackets